The Kerbis Peterhans's wood mouse (Hylomyscus kerbispeterhansi) is a species of rodent in the family Muridae. It is found in western Kenya, and presumably eastern Uganda on Mt. Elgon, and was first described as a new species to science in 2014. Its natural habitat is tropical montane rainforest. It occurs in sympatry with Hylomyscus endorobae in the Mau Forest of Kenya. The specific epithet honours American mammalogist and educator .

References

Endemic fauna of Kenya
Hylomyscus
Mammals of Kenya
Mammals described in 2014